Graeme Clifford Rummans (born 13 December 1976) is an Australian cricketer. He was born in the suburb of Camperdown in Sydney. Later growing up in Roselands in Sydney. He is a left-handed batsman who bowls slow left-arm orthodox.

Rummans went to Narwee High School in Sydney's South. He played all of his Junior cricket in the St George DCA for Kingsgrove and Captained all St George junior cricket teams before making his Grade debut. 

He initially debuted for the New South Wales Sheffild Shield team on 5 March 1998. Batting at number six he only managed eleven when he was trapped in front by Colin Miller.

His career suffered a major setback in 2002 when he tested positive for the banned masking agent probenecid. For his offence he received a one-month ban from all cricket and a A$2000 fine.

Ahead of the following season he moved to Victoria in an effort to further his first-class career, yet despite large success at club level with St Kilda (where he won consecutive Ryder Medals as the best player in Premier Cricket), Rummans was unable to attain a regular position with the state team.

He moved back to New South Wales after the 2006–7 season for family reasons and captained St George to successive First Grade premierships. He returned to Victoria for the 2009–10 season, during which he won his third Ryder Medal.

Rummans is one of the most prolific winners in Australian Grade/First Class cricket history.

See also
 List of New South Wales representative cricketers

References

External links

Australian cricketers
Australian sportspeople in doping cases
New South Wales cricketers
Victoria cricketers
1976 births
Living people
St George cricketers
Doping cases in Australian cricket
Cricketers from Sydney